Manic is a Canadian documentary film, directed by Kalina Bertin and released in 2017. The film depicts Bertin's efforts, in response to a family history of bipolar disorder, to investigate parts of her father's prior life in Montserrat that she did not know about.

The film premiered at the 2017 Hot Docs Canadian International Documentary Festival.

Awards
When Daniel Cross won Hot Docs' Don Haig Award, he selected Bertin as the recipient of a $5,000 grant for emerging women documentary filmmakers.

The film received two Canadian Screen Award nominations at the 6th Canadian Screen Awards, for Best Feature Length Documentary and Best Editing in a Documentary (Anouk Deschênes).

The film was shortlisted for the Prix collégial du cinéma québécois in 2019.

References

External links
 

2017 films
2017 documentary films
Canadian documentary films
EyeSteelFilm films
2010s English-language films
2010s Canadian films